Isa TKM was a Venezuelan musical group created in the 2008 and based on the soap opera Isa TKM. Its members included Maria Gabriela de Faría, Reinaldo Zavarce, Milena Torres, Micaela Castelloti and Willy Martin.

Their first CD was launched in 2009 and is called Isa TKM: La Fiesta va a Empezar (the party is going to start), principally because of the popularity of the program transmitted on Nickelodeon Latin America and MTV Tr3s at international level, filmed in Venezuela with a local cast.

The Isa TKM's group had left its mark in countries such as Colombia, Mexico, Argentina and Central America, winning numerous awards and presenting many concerts on tour, Isa TKM: la Fiesta va a Empezar.

Their big impact that caused a vast number of people to be fans of the show, surprised the cast, producers and directors, like all Venezuela, because it started as a typical soap opera, but became so popular in all America.

Isa TKM has four promotional video singles and three official video singles.

Albums

See also 
Nickelodeon

External links 
Official Mundonick's page (in spanish) 
Official MySpace Profile (in spanish)

Venezuelan musical groups